Chardigny is a French surname. Notable people with the surname include:

Barthélémy-François Chardigny (1757–1813), French sculptor
Louis Chardigny (1909–1990), French historian
Pierre Joseph Chardigny (1794–1866), French sculptor

French-language surnames